Robert Shorthouse Robertson (31 December 1887 – 26 August 1960) was an Australian politician.

He was born in Hamilton. In 1946 he was elected to the Tasmanian House of Assembly as a Liberal member for Wilmot. He served until his defeat in 1950. Robertson died in Launceston in 1960.

References

1887 births
1960 deaths
Liberal Party of Australia members of the Parliament of Tasmania
Members of the Tasmanian House of Assembly
20th-century Australian politicians